Temuniana was a Roman town of Roman North Africa which existed during the Vandal Kingdom, Byzantine Empire and Roman Empire.

Archaeology
The Roman town of Temuniana has been tentatively identified with ruins at Henchir-Temounia, in Tunisia., in Tunisia. These ruins include many subterranean cisterns, There are also remains of pipes and dams.

History
Temuniana was also the seat of an ancient Catholic diocese There are three bishops of antiquity known from the town:
Cresconius, . Plebis Temonianensis. Fl 411.
Cresconius Temoniarensis, fl.484.
Victorinus, . Ecc. Temunianensis, fl641. 
Today the bishopric survives as a titular see of the Roman Catholic Church. The current bishop is Robert Anthony Brucato who replaced Peter Joseph Connors of Ballarat in 1997.

References

Archaeological sites in Tunisia
Roman towns and cities in Africa (Roman province)